Bruce Lee (1940–1973) was a Chinese-American martial artist, actor, martial arts instructor, philosopher, and filmmaker.

Bruce Lee may also refer to:

People
 Bruce George Peter Lee (born 1960), British arsonist and serial killer
 Bruce Lee Rothschild, mathematics professor
 Mike Park, American musician aka Bruce Lee

Books
 Bruce Lee (comics), 1995 Malibu Comics comic
 Bruce Lee: The Man Only I Knew, biography
 Bruce Lee Library, a set of non-fiction books

Motion pictures
 Bruce Lee (2017 film), a Tamil action-comedy film
 Bruce Lee: A Dragon Story, fictionalized biopic
 Bruce Lee: A Warrior's Journey, documentary film
 Bruce Lee, My Brother, biopic
 Bruce Lee: The Curse of the Dragon, biopic
 Bruce Lee: The Lost Interview, interview film
 Bruce Lee: The Man, The Myth, dramatized biopic
 Bruce Lee: The Fighter, a Telugu film directed by Srinu Vytla and starring Ram Charan
 Dragon: The Bruce Lee Story, biopic
 The Legend of Bruce Lee, biopic

Videogames
 Bruce Lee (video game), a 1984 platform fighter by Datasoft
 Bruce Lee: Return of the Legend, a 2003 video game for the Game Boy Advance
 Bruce Lee: Quest of the Dragon, a 2002 video game for the Xbox
 Bruce Lee Lives: The Fall of Hong Kong Palace, a 1989 PC computer game
 Dragon: The Bruce Lee Story, a 1993 video game
 Bruce Lee: Enter the Game, a 2014 Android/iOS video game

Songs
 "Bruce Lee" (song), a song by Underworld
 "Bruce Lee", a 2016 song by Robbie Williams from The Heavy Entertainment Show

Other
 The Bruce Lee Band, pop-punk band
 Bruce Lee statue in Hong Kong
 Mostar Bruce Lee statue

See also
 Bruceploitation
 Bruce Lai, Hong Kong actor and part of Bruceploitation
 Bruce Le (呂小龍), Hong Kong actor and part of Bruceploitation
 Bruce Li (何宗道), Taiwanese actor and Bruce Lee impersonator in Bruceploitation
 Bruce-Li, the badminton team of Alexandra Bruce and Michelle Li